Shoaf is a surname. A notable person with this surname is:

 Jason Shoaf (born 1979), American politician

Other uses
 Henry Shoaf Farm, North Carolina
 Shoaf Historic District, Fayette County, Pennsylvania
 Shoaf, Pennsylvania, a village in Georges Township, Fayette County, Pennsylvania

See also
 Shoaff (surname)